Patrice Djokoue (born 16 May 1990, in Cotonou) is a Beninese international football player who currently plays in Benin for Requins.

Career 
He began to play for Requins and was promoted to first team in 2009.

International 
Djokoue his first call up was on 25 March 2009 against Ghana national football team.

References

External links 
 

1990 births
Living people
Beninese footballers
Benin international footballers
People from Cotonou
Requins de l'Atlantique FC players
Association football midfielders